Basil Hazelwood Smith (21 December 1901 – 28 August 1992) was an Australian rules footballer who played for the South Melbourne Football Club and Richmond Football Club in the Victorian Football League (VFL).

In 1925, Smith was appointed as coach of the Albury Football Club.

In 1926, Smith played with the Prahran Football Club.

Notes

External links 
		
Basil Smith's profile at Collingwood Forever

1901 births
1992 deaths
Australian rules footballers from Victoria (Australia)
Sydney Swans players
Richmond Football Club players